Meximachilis is a genus of jumping bristletails in the family Machilidae. There are at least three described species in Meximachilis.

Species
These three species belong to the genus Meximachilis:
 Meximachilis cockendolpheri Kaplin, 1994
 Meximachilis dampfi Wygodzinsky, 1946
 Meximachilis tuxeni Sturm, 1991

References

Further reading

 
 
 
 
 
 

Archaeognatha
Articles created by Qbugbot